Entrichiria is a genus of moths of the family Yponomeutidae.

Species
Entrichiria amphiphracta - Meyrick, 1921 

Yponomeutidae